Ah Bu Şarkıların Gözü Kör Olsun (Oh, These Songs Should Blackout) is Candan Erçetin's eighth studio album released on 25 November 2015. The album is released to celebrate Erçetin's 20th year of career. Similar to Aman Doktor, which was released to mark the 10th anniversary of her career, this album contains covers of classical Turkish music.

The live version of "Unuttun Beni Zalim", recorded on 10 May 2015, was released as the first promotional single on 3 June 2015. "Ah Bu Şarkıların Gözü Kör Olsun" was released as the second promotional single on 26 August 2015.

Track listing

Release history

References 

Candan Erçetin albums
2015 albums